Hyblaea canisigna is a moth in the family Hyblaeidae described by Swinhoe in 1902.

References

Hyblaeidae